Horbach is an Ortsgemeinde – a community belonging to a Verbandsgemeinde – in the Westerwaldkreis in Rhineland-Palatinate, Germany.

Geography

The community lies in the Westerwald south of Montabaur in the Nassau Nature Park. The community belongs to the Verbandsgemeinde of Montabaur, a kind of collective municipality.

History
In 1486, Horbach had its first documentary mention.

Politics

Community council
The council is made up of 12 council members who were elected in a majority vote in a municipal election on 13 June 2004.

Coat of arms
Horbach's location in the so-called Buchfinkenländchen is symbolized by the common chaffinch in the community's arms. The wavy bend stands for one of the headwater streams that builds the Daubach, which rises in Horbach. The heraldic lily refers to the name's meaning (horo = swamp), recalling as it does a kind of lily that grows in wetlands. The tinctures red and silver were the heraldic colours borne by the Electorate of Trier.

Economy and infrastructure

The nearest Autobahn interchange is Montabaur on the A 3 (Cologne–Frankfurt) some 9 km away.

References

External links
Horbach in the collective municipality’s Web pages 

Municipalities in Rhineland-Palatinate
Westerwaldkreis